The Orland Buttes consist of two buttes (hills) separated by Hambright Creek. Black Butte Lake is an artificial lake created to provide flood control and irrigation.

The Orland Buttes stand in the fields of the northern Central Valley of California. The southern butte is the highest at  while the northern butte has a summit elevation of about  They are a popular hiking/climbing destination.

References

External links
 
 
 

Buttes of California
Landforms of Tehama County, California
Landforms of Glenn County, California
Tourist attractions in Glenn County, California
Tourist attractions in Tehama County, California